Sanna, laavu Molakolukulu (molagolukulu) is a variety of rice cultivated in Andhra Pradesh in India. This variety is often called nellore molakolukulu perhaps due to its origin in the Nellore region of Andhra Pradesh. It has been a popular variety in Nellore, and has been formally developed into better varieties since 1937.

The variety is known for improved capacity in handling monsoon season rainfall. However its popularity has diminished due to farmer's moving to grow shorter duration crops.

References 

Rice varieties
Agriculture in Andhra Pradesh
Rice production in India